James Fulford (1841 – 6 September 1922) was an Australian politician.

He was born in West Maitland and was educated locally before becoming a businessman. He was town clerk at West Maitland from 1867 and also worked for the Maitland Mercury in a business capacity. He was an alderman at West Maitland, serving twice as mayor, and was later mayor of Dundas for thirteen years and an alderman at Waverley. In 1880 he was elected to the New South Wales Legislative Assembly for West Maitland, but he did not re-contest in 1882. Fulford died at Marrickville in 1922.

References

 

1841 births
1922 deaths
Members of the New South Wales Legislative Assembly
Mayors of places in New South Wales